Michele Orecchia (26 December 1903 – 11 December 1981) was an Italian professional road bicycle racer, who won one stage in the 1932 Tour de France. He also competed in the individual and team road race events at the 1928 Summer Olympics.

Major results

1927
Giro del Sestriere
1929
Giro d'Italia:
9th place overall classification
1932
Tour de France:
Winner stage 8

References

External links

Official Tour de France results for Michele Orecchia

1903 births
1981 deaths
Italian male cyclists
Italian Tour de France stage winners
Cyclists from Marseille
Olympic cyclists of Italy
Cyclists at the 1928 Summer Olympics
French male cyclists